Virginia Ann Marie Patton Moss (June 25, 1925 – August 18, 2022) was an American actress. After appearing in several films in the early 1940s, she was cast in her most well-known role as Ruth Dakin Bailey in Frank Capra's It's a Wonderful Life (1946). In 1949, Patton retired from acting, and her final film credit was The Lucky Stiff (1949).

Early life
Patton was born in Cleveland, Ohio on June 25, 1925, to Marie (née Cain) and Donald Patton. She was raised in her father's hometown of Portland, Oregon, where her family moved when she was an infant. She was a niece of General George S. Patton. Patton graduated from Jefferson High School in Portland, and then moved to Los Angeles, California, where she attended the University of Southern California.

Career

While a student at USC, Patton began to audition for acting parts. She collaborated in plays with screenwriter William C. DeMille while in college. She had several minor supporting film appearances before being cast in Capra's It's a Wonderful Life (1946) as Ruth Dakin Bailey, the wife of George Bailey's younger brother Harry.

Although Capra did not know Patton personally, she read the role for him, and he signed her to a contract. Patton later said that she was the only girl the famous director ever signed in his entire career. Patton still gave interviews about It's a Wonderful Life, and she was the last surviving credited member of the adult actors in the film (a number of child actors are still alive).

Patton made only four films after It's a Wonderful Life, including her first lead in the B-Western Black Eagle (1948). She appeared in the drama The Burning Cross (1946), a film about a World War II veteran who becomes embroiled with the Ku Klux Klan upon returning to his hometown.

Personal life
Patton was married to Cruse W. Moss from 1949 until his death in 2018. She gave up acting in the late 1940s to concentrate on raising a family with her husband in Ann Arbor, Michigan. She later attended the University of Michigan.

Patton died on August 18, 2022 at age 97. She was the last surviving adult cast member of It's a Wonderful Life.

Filmography

References

Citations

Bibliography

External links
 
 
 
 Interview with Virginia Patton in 2013

1925 births
2022 deaths
20th-century American actresses
American film actresses
Actresses from Portland, Oregon
Jefferson High School (Portland, Oregon) alumni
University of Southern California alumni
University of Michigan alumni
Actors from Ann Arbor, Michigan
Patton family